Lwengo District is a district in the Central Region of Uganda. Lwengo is the largest town in the district and the location of the district headquarters.

Location
Lwengo District is bordered by Sembabule District to the north, Bukomansimbi District to the north-east, Masaka District to the east, Rakai District to the south, and Lyantonde District to the west. The coordinates of the district are:00 24S, 31 25E.

Overview
Created by an Act of Parliament, Lwengo District became functional on 1 July 2010. Before that, it was part of the Masaka District.

Population
The 1991 national population census estimated the district population at 212,600. The next census in 2002 put the population at about 242,300. In 2012, the population was estimated at 267,300.

Economic activities

Means of earning a livelihood in Lwengo District include: 
 Livestock keeping
 Fishing
 Trade and pit sawing

References

 
Districts of Uganda
Central Region, Uganda